John Lawrence Didion (October 24, 1947 – December 10,  2013) was an American football player, a Center in the National Football League for the Washington Redskins and New Orleans Saints from 1969 to 1974.

Early years
Born and raised in Woodland, California, Didion played college football at Oregon State University under head coach Dee Andros and was a consensus All-American.

NFL career
Selected in the seventh round of the 1969 NFL/AFL Draft, Didion played his first two seasons in the NFL for the Redskins under head coaches Vince Lombardi and Bill Austin. He was traded in January 1971 by new head coach George Allen to the Saints in the deal which brought quarterback Billy Kilmer to the "Over the Hill Gang."

After football
From 1998 to 2010, Didion was the sheriff of Pacific County, Washington.

Didion died at age 66 in Portland, Oregon.

References

External links

1947 births
2013 deaths
All-American college football players
American football linebackers
New Orleans Saints players
Oregon State Beavers football players
Washington Redskins players